Catherina Gwynne Becker (née Krüger) is an Alexander von Humboldt Professor at TU Dresden, and was formerly Professor of Neural Development and Regeneration at the University of Edinburgh.

Early life and education
Catherina Becker was born in Marburg, Germany in 1964. She then trained as post-doctorate at the Swiss Federal Institute of Technology in Zürich, the Department Dev Cell Biol funded by an EMBO long-term fellowship, at the University of California, Irvine in USA and the Centre for Molecular Neurobiology Hamburg (ZMNH), Germany where she took a position of group leader in 2000.

Career
Becker joined the University of Edinburgh in 2005 as senior Lecturer and was appointed personal chair in neural development and regeneration in 2013. She was also the Director of Postgraduate Training at the Centre for Neuroregeneration up to 2015, then centre director up to 2017.

Research
Becker's research focuses on a better understanding of the factors governing the generation of neurons and axonal pathfinding in the CNS during development and regeneration using the zebrafish model to identify fundamental mechanisms in vertebrates with clear translational implications for CNS injury and neurodegenerative diseases. 
The Becker group established the zebrafish as a model for spinal cord regeneration.
Their research found that functional regeneration is near perfect, but anatomical repair does not fully recreate the previous network, instead, new neurons are generated and extensive rewiring occurs. 
They have identified neurotransmitter signalling as one mechanism underlying regenerative neurogenesis.
More recently, they have established larval regeneration paradigms in which highly selective cell ablation can be introduced and fundamental principles of functional repair, regenerative neurogenesis and rewiring can be analyzed.
This system is scalable, allowing fast genetic screens into spinal cord repair.

Catherina Becker is on the executive board of the European Zebrafish Society EZB e.V. and on the advisory board of the International Society for Regenerative Biology ISRB.

Awards
2016 MRC LMS Suffrage Science Award (Life Sciences)
2016 Eurolife Distinguished Lecture
2021 Alexander-von-Humboldt Professorship

References

Living people
Academics of the University of Edinburgh
University of Bremen alumni
1964 births
German emigrants to Scotland
German women academics
German biologists
Regenerative biomedicine